The Compaq Deskpro is a line of business-oriented personal computers manufactured by Compaq, then discontinued after the merger with Hewlett-Packard. Models were produced containing microprocessors from the 8086 up to the x86-based Intel Pentium 4.

History

Deskpro (8086) and Deskpro 286
The original Compaq Deskpro (released in 1984), available in several disk configurations, is an XT-class PC equipped with an 8 MHz 8086 CPU and Compaq's unique display hardware that combined Color Graphics Adapter graphics with high resolution Monochrome Display Adapter text. As a result, it was considerably faster than the original IBM PC, the XT and the AT, and had a much better quality text display compared to IBM PCs which were equipped with either the IBM Monochrome Display Adapter or Color Graphics Adapter cards.  

Its hardware and BIOS were claimed to be 100% compatible with the IBM PC, like the earlier Compaq Portable. This compatibility had given Compaq the lead over companies like Columbia Data Products, Dynalogic, Eagle Computer and Corona Data Systems. The latter two companies were threatened by IBM for BIOS copyright infringement, and settled out of court, agreeing to re-implement their BIOS. Compaq used a clean room design reverse-engineered BIOS, avoiding legal jeopardy.

In 1985, Compaq released the Deskpro 286, which looks quite similar to the IBM PC/AT.

Deskpro 386

In September 1986, the Deskpro 386 was announced after Intel released its 80386 microprocessor, beating IBM by seven months on their comparable 386 computer, thus making a name for themselves. The IBM-made 386DX machine, the IBM PS/2 Model 80, reached the market almost a year later,
PC Tech Journal honored the Deskpro 386 with its 1986 Product of the Year award. 
The Deskpro 386/25 was released August, 1988 and cost $10,299.

Other
The form factor for the Compaq Deskpro is mostly the desktop model which lies upon a desk, with a monitor placed on top of it. Compaq has produced many tower upright models that have been highly successful in sales, and are usually convertible to a desktop form factor. An SFF (small form factor) desktop version was also produced during the Deskpro's lifetime. The Deskpro was replaced by the Evo in 2001.

Models
The many different models include the:
 Deskpro 286e
 Deskpro 386: released as the first MS-DOS, PC-compatible 32-bit computer with 386 processor.
 Deskpro 386S: Second Generation 386 introducing 16-bit bus 386SX processors
 Deskpro XE 486 ISA and IDE
 Deskpro XL: high-end workstation with EISA and SCSI either  and 486, Pentium, Pentium Pro
 Deskpro M: 386, 486 and 586 early Pentium models
 Deskpro 2000: Pentium 1, Pentium Pro and Pentium 2
 Deskpro 4000: Pentium 1 with MMX & Pentium 2
 Deskpro 6000: Pentium 1, Pentium Pro and Pentium 2 and SCSI
 Deskpro DX 
 Deskpro EXD, SB, EN, ENL: Pentium III-based 
 Deskpro EVO500 series: the last of the range with Pentium 4 processors

References

Bibliography

 Compaq Computer Corporation. Reference Guide: Compaq Deskpro 2000 Series of Personal Computers. 3rd edition, January 1998. Part Number 278019-003.
 Compaq Computer Corporation. Reference Guide: Compaq Deskpro 4000 Series of Personal Computers/Compaq Deskpro 6000 Series of Personal Computers. 2nd edition, September 1997. Part Number 270844-002.

Weblinks

 : NYT article about the DeskPro 386-20.

Deskpro
IBM PC compatibles
Business desktop computers